East Gridley (formerly, Gridley Station) is an unincorporated community in Butte County, California. It lies at an elevation of 98 feet (30 m). The town was founded as Gridley Station on the Sacramento Northern Railroad.

References

Unincorporated communities in Butte County, California
Gridley, California
Unincorporated communities in California